Friends Book is a 2012 Indian Telugu-language suspense drama film directed by R. P. Patnaik (who also composed the music). The film stars Nishal, Nanduri Uday, Surya Teja, and Archana Sharma.

Cast 
Nishal as Nischal
Nanduri Uday as Akshay
Surya Teja as Surya
Archana Sharma as Nithya 
Archana Shetty as Madhu 
Soori as Venugopal
Suresh
Rao Ramesh
Chalapathi Rao
Bhimaneni Srinivasa Rao

Release 
The Times of India gave the film a rating of three-and-a-half out of five stars and wrote that "The first half appeared to drag a bit, but as the mystery deepens, it could be an edge-of-the-seat thriller". 123 Telugu gave the film two-and-a-half out of five stars and wrote that " There is absolutely no logic in much of the film and you can safely stay away from this ‘thriller’". Full Hyderabad gave the film a rating of six-and-a-half out of ten and wrote that "In all, this is a rather decent attempt, but heavily flawed. Watch it if you care enough to be non-judgemental".

References

External links 

Indian drama films
2012 drama films
2012 films